Milltown Methodist Church (known alternatively as Milltown Chapel, Milltown Primative Methodist Chapel and Ashover Hay Primative Methodist Chapel) is a now-closed, listed Methodist chapel in the village of Milltown, Derbyshire.

The chapel was founded by Hugh Bourne who formed a society in the district. The building, which also has a graveyard (though this no longer present), was opened in 1824, and was expanded in 1870. The building is built from coursed gritstone with a roof of Welsh slate. 

The chapel became Grade II listed in 1995. Worship ceased at an unrecorded date after .

References

Grade II listed churches in Derbyshire
 Churches completed in 1824